Lawrence Duchow (Potter, Wisconsin, May 9, 1914 – December 16, 1972) was an American bandleader recorded on the RCA Victor label from 1932 to 1954.

Career

He was a member of the International Polka Association and Polka Hall of Fame. With his Red Raven Orchestra, named after the Red Raven Polka, he competed in polka contests against the bands of Frankie Yankovic, Whoopee John Wilfahrt, Romy Gosz, Louis Bashell, and Harold Loeffelmacher.

Lawrence played many of his shows at Kleist's Hall in Potter, Wisconsin. At one time, he had a weekly radio show on WGN in Chicago.

He was involved in a bogus check scandal in 1953 and arrested in New York. He then resettled in California, but he returned to Wisconsin in 1969.

References

1914 births
1972 deaths
People from Calumet County, Wisconsin
Musicians from Wisconsin
20th-century American musicians
Polka musicians